Gaetano "Gates" Orlando (born November 13, 1962) is a Canadian-born Italian former ice hockey centre and coach. He played in the National Hockey League (NHL) with the Buffalo Sabres between 1984 and 1987. The rest of his career, which lasted from 1984 to 1999, was mainly spent in the Italian Serie A and Swiss Nationalliga A. Internationally Orlando played for the Italian national team at several World Championships and at the 1994 and 1998 Winter Olympics. He later coached in the minor leagues for a few years, and also worked as a scout for the New Jersey Devils of the NHL. His father's ancestry hails from Agnone, Isernia, Molise, Italy.

International play
By virtue of his Italian ancestry and playing in Italy, Orlando acquired Italian citizenship and was eligible for the Italian national ice hockey team.

He participated in the following tournaments:

 8 A-World Championships: 1992, 1993, 1994, 1995, 1996, 1997, 1998, 1999
 2 B-World Championships: 1990, 1991
 2 Olympic Games: 1994 in Lillehammer and 1998 in Nagano

Orlando wore jersey number 17 in the national team.

Artificial heart and Heart Transplant
A sarcoidosis patient, in March 2011, Orlando was diagnosed with congestive heart failure. He was participating in a clinical study of Life Vest, a wearable defibrillator.  On May 22, the defibrillator saved his life after his heart stopped for 40 seconds. Orlando was the first participant in the study to have required the vest to deliver a shock. 

On April 4, 2012, Orlando received an artificial heart to extend his life while he waits for a donated biological heart. The operation, performed at the University of Rochester Medical Center, was the first such operation in Upstate New York.

A donor heart became available February 4, 2013 so the transplant teams were mobilized for surgery that day at the University of Rochester Medical Center. He was able to return home 25 days later.

Career statistics

Regular season and playoffs

International

Coaching career
After retiring from pro ice hockey by the end of 1998–99 with HC Lugano, Orlando become a coach. At the World Championships he served as an assistant coach with the Italian national team while still being a player.

Awards and honors

1990 - Serie A Champion with HC Bolzano
1992 - Serie A Champion with Milano Devils
1993 - Serie A Champion with Milano Devils
1994 - Serie A Champion with AC Milan Hockey
1997 - NLA Champion with SC Bern
1999 - NLA Champion with HC Lugano

References

External links
 

1962 births
Albany River Rats players
Bolzano HC players
Buffalo Sabres draft picks
Buffalo Sabres players
Canadian ice hockey centres
Canadian people of Italian descent
HC Lugano players
HC Merano players
HC Milano players
Ice hockey people from Montreal
Ice hockey players at the 1994 Winter Olympics
Ice hockey players at the 1998 Winter Olympics
Living people
Montreal Juniors players
New Jersey Devils scouts
Olympic ice hockey players of Italy
People from LaSalle, Quebec
Providence Friars men's ice hockey players
Rochester Americans players
SC Bern players
SCL Tigers players
United Hockey League coaches
Canadian expatriate ice hockey players in Italy
Canadian expatriate ice hockey players in Switzerland
AHCA Division I men's ice hockey All-Americans